Montaignac-sur-Doustre is a commune in the Corrèze department in Nouvelle-Aquitaine in south-central France. It is the result of the merger, on 1 January 2022, of the communes of Montaignac-Saint-Hippolyte and Le Jardin. Montaignac-Saint-Hippolyte station has rail connections to Brive-la-Gaillarde, Ussel and Bordeaux.

See also
Communes of the Corrèze department

References

Communes of Corrèze
2022 establishments in France
States and territories established in 2022